Saint-Sixte may refer to the following places:

 Saint-Sixte, Loire, a commune in the Loire department, France
 Saint-Sixte, Lot-et-Garonne, a commune in the Lot-et-Garonne department, France
 Saint-Sixte, Quebec, Canada

See also
 Sixte (disambiguation)
 Saint Sixtus (disambiguation)